This is a list of municipalities in the Boyacá Department in Colombia.

 Almeida
 Aquitania
 Arcabuco
 Belén
 Berbeo
 Betéitiva
 Boavita
 Boyacá
 Briceño
 Buenavista
 Busbanzá
 Caldas
 Campohermoso
 Cerinza
 Chinavita
 Chiquinquirá
 Chíquiza
 Chiscas
 Chita
 Chitaraque
 Chivatá
 Chivor
 Ciénaga
 Coper
 Corrales
 Covarachía
 Cubará
 Cucaita
 Cuítiva
 Cómbita
 Duitama
 El Cocuy
 El Espino
 Firavitoba
 Floresta
 Gachantivá
 Garagoa
 Guacamayas
 Guateque
 Guayatá
 Gámeza
 Güicán
 Iza
 Jenesano
 Jericó
 La Capilla
 La Uvita
 La Victoria
 Labranzagrande
 Macanal
 Maripí
 Miraflores
 Mongua
 Monguí
 Moniquirá
 Motavita
 Muzo
 Nobsa
 Nuevo Colón
 Oicatá
 Otanche
 Pachavita
 Paipa
 Pajarito
 Panqueba
 Pauna
 Paya
 Paz de Río
 Pesca
 Pisba
 Puerto Boyacá
 Páez
 Quipama
 Ramiriquí
 Rondón
 Ráquira
 Saboyá
 Samacá
 San Eduardo
 San José de Pare
 San Luis de Gaceno
 San Mateo
 San Miguel de Sema
 San Pablo de Borbur
 Santa María
 Santa Rosa de Viterbo
 Santa Sofía
 Santana
 Sativanorte
 Sativasur
 Siachoque
 Soatá
 Socha
 Socotá
 Sogamoso
 Somondoco
 Sora
 Soracá
 Sotaquirá
 Susacón
 Sutamarchán
 Sutatenza
 Sáchica
 Tasco
 Tenza
 Tibaná
 Tibasosa
 Tinjacá
 Tipacoque
 Toca
 Togüí, Boyacá
 Tota
 Tunja
 Tununguá
 Turmequé
 Tuta
 Tutasá
 Tópaga
 Ventaquemada
 Villa de Leyva
 Viracachá
 Zetaquirá
 Úmbita

References
Boyaca Financial Institute; municipalities in Boyaca

 
Boyaca